Jean Paul Timoléon de Cossé-Brissac, 7th Duke of Brissac (12 October 1698, in Paris – 1784, in Sarrelouis), was a French general during the reign of King Louis XV. He is most notable for leading the French vanguard at the Battle of Minden, and he became a Marshal of France. He was also a Grand Panetier of France.

Life and career
He was the second son and third of five children of Artus-Timoléon (1668-1709), Count then 5th Duke of Brissac, and of Marie Louise Béchameil de Nointel (daughter of the financier Louis de Béchameil). He began his military career as a knight of the Order of Saint John of Jerusalem, becoming a garde de la marine in 1713. He served from 1714 on the galleys operating out of Malta, fighting in various actions against the Ottoman Empire. In 1716, he fought at the victory at the siege of Corfu under Johann Matthias von der Schulenburg.

He left the navy in 1717 and returned to France. There, he became the mestre de camp of a cavalry regiment named after him, and he served until the Seven Years' War. He was rewarded for his good conduct at the French defeat at the Battle of Minden in 1759 by being made a Marshal of France.

His courage and politeness were seen as the model of an old-style loyal and frank French knight. He continued wearing Louis XIV-era costume, and for a long time wore a long scarf and a two-queue hairstyle. Charles, Count of Charolais, one day found him at his mistress's house and brusquely told him "Get out, sir", but Brissac replied "Sir, your ancestors would have said 'We get out'".

He inherited the ducal title in 1732 when his elder brother, Charles Timoléon Louis (1693-1732), the 6th Duke of Brissac, died without a male heir.

Marriage and issue
In 1732, he married Marie Josèphe Durey de Sauroy (d. 1756), with whom he had three children:
Louis-Joseph (1733-1759), died without issue
Louis-Hercule (1734-1792), succeeded as Duke of Brissac but died without surviving male issue
Pierre Emmanuel Joseph Timoléon (1741-1756), marquis de Thouarcé, died unmarried

After Louis-Hercule's death in 1792 without a surviving son, the ducal title passed to Timoléon de Cossé-Brissac (1775-1848). He was the eldest son of Hyacinthe-Hugues de Cossé-Brissac, Duke of Cossé (1746-1813), whose father was René-Hugues de Cossé-Brissac, Count of Cossé (1702-1754). René-Hugues was the third son of Artus-Timoléon de Cossé-Brissac, 5th Duke of Brissac (1668-1709), the father of the 6th and 7th Dukes of Brissac.

Sources
  "Jean Paul Timoléon de Cossé-Brissac", in Louis-Gabriel Michaud, Biographie universelle ancienne et moderne : histoire par ordre alphabétique de la vie publique et privée de tous les hommes avec la collaboration de plus de 300 savants et littérateurs français ou étrangers, 2nd edition, 1843-1865

External links
  Jean Paul Timoléon de Cossé-Brissac on Saarländische Biografien

1698 births
1784 deaths
Marshals of France
Military governors of Paris
Knights of Malta
Jean Paul